Sheldon Levy  (born 1949) is a veteran Canadian business leader in higher education who is currently President and Vice-Chancellor of University Canada West (UCW) in Vancouver and a special advisor on the development of the forthcoming University of Niagara Falls. He previously served as President and Vice-Chancellor of Ryerson University (now Toronto Metropolitan University) (2005-15), as Deputy Minister in the Government of Ontario (2015-17), and in many other leadership roles. He has been honoured many times for his lifelong contributions to student entrepreneurship and digital innovation in higher education.

Life and Career

Education 
Levy studied at Downsview Public and Secondary School, in Toronto, and earned his master’s degree in mathematics from York University.

Early Career 
Levy began his career in university administration shortly after completing his degree in mathematics and held numerous roles including Vice president, institutional affairs, at York University; President, Sheridan College of Applied Arts and Technology; Vice president, government and institutional relations, at the University of Toronto; and Vice president, finance and strategy, at Ontario Tech University (formerly University of Ontario Institute of Technology).

Ryerson University 
In 2005 Levy was appointed President and vice chancellor of Ryerson University (now Toronto Metropolitan University). He served in the role from 1 August 2005 through 30 November 2015. His tenure was marked by a number of campus revitalization projects, including the establishment of the Mattamy Athletic Centre in the former Maple Leaf Gardens building and the construction of the Student Learning Centre on Yonge Street.

Subsequent Positions 
In December 2015, Levy was appointed Deputy Minister of Training, Colleges and Universities for the Government of Ontario, a position he held until September 2017. He then served as CEO of NEXT Canada from November 2017 to December 2018 and as Special advisor to the Minister of Small Business and Export Promotion, the Honourable Mary Ng, from December 2018 to September 2021.

University Canada West 
In September 2021, Levy was announced as the Interim President and Vice-Chancellor of UCW, replacing Brock Dykeman. By March 2022, he was appointed as the permanent President and Vice-Chancellor of the school. The University announced that Levy would be staying on in 2023. In addition to his role at UCW, Levy has also been named as a special advisor in the development of University Niagara Falls Canada.
  
Levy is also a strategic consultant and special advisor to Knightstone Capital Management Inc.

Board Appointments 
Levy is a member of the Board of Directors of Baycrest Health Sciences. His previous board appointments have included the Toronto Region Board of Trade, Waterfront Toronto and the Innovation Institute of Ontario. He also served as Honorary Chair of the Brookfield Institute Advisory Board.

Personal Life 
Levy is a known motorcycle enthusiast. Ryerson University Magazine reported in its winter 2015 issue that Levy “likes to go on trips that last for days and that don’t have any precise destination.” He rode his motorcycle across central and western Canada, from Toronto to Vancouver, in the summer of 2022.

Awards and Honours

Order of Canada 
In November 2020, Levy was amongst 114 new appointments to the Order of Canada as an appointed Officer, “for his exceptional leadership as an education administrator and for promoting student entrepreneur incubators on university campuses across the country.”

Honorary Doctorates 
Levy has been bestowed three honorary doctorates in the past from three Canadian universities including: 
 A Doctor of Laws (LLD) from York University in 1999.
 A Doctor of Education (Ed.D.) from Lakehead University in 2018.
 A Doctor of Laws (LLD) from Mount Allison University in 2019.

Accolades 
An article by Toronto Life magazine, called the "Ryerson Revolution", describes in detail how Levy has taken the initiative since starting as president to improve Ryerson University, by purchasing Maple Leaf Gardens, shutting down Gould Street and a space sharing agreement with AMC Theatres, creating an urban campus, instead of the more traditional closed-off university campus.

He was the driving force behind the Digital Media Zone (DMZ) which opened in April 2010. It is a multidisciplinary workspace for research and learning, home to both entrepreneurial companies and industry solution-providers. With access to overhead, business services, and a rich network of contacts, entrepreneurs and researchers can accelerate product launches, and contribute to Canada's success in the digital economy. It has taken over three floors at the AMC Complex building.

In 2015, Levy was the subject of a viral video produced by Ryerson University custodian Bob Skelly.

Controversies 
In 2006, Levy sparked controversy by defending the decision of Ryerson's Awards and Ceremonials Standing Committee of the Academic Council to award an honorary degree to Margaret Somerville, who is noted for her opposition to same-sex marriage and gay families. He explained that while Ryerson University did not agree with Dr. Somerville's views, revoking the award would be counter to freedom of speech and the right to expression.

In 2008, as part of a heritage preservation agreement for the construction of the Student Learning Centre on Yonge Street, Ryerson agreed to preserve the Sam the Record Man sign that had been located on the site. When the university later proposed to install smaller replica signs on Yonge Street instead, Levy and the university were criticized for attempting to change the original agreement. In 2017 the original sign was re-installed above 277 Victoria Street, steps from its original location.

References

External links
 Ryerson University: Sheldon Levy's Biography
"Ryerson Revolution"

Presidents of Toronto Metropolitan University
Academic staff of the University of Toronto
Living people
Canadian university and college chief executives
Ontario civil servants
York University alumni
1949 births
Officers of the Order of Canada